Euphorbia micromera is a species of flowering plant in the family Euphorbiaceae. It is known by the common name Sonoran sandmat. It is native to the southwestern United States from California to Texas, and northern Mexico, where it grows in sandy soils in desert and other dry habitat. It is an annual herb forming a small mat of slender stems. The hairy to hairless leaves are oblong in shape and just a few millimeters long. The tiny inflorescence is a cyathium less than a millimeter wide. It lacks the appendages that many similar species have in their cyathia. It has only a central female flower and 2 to 5 male flowers surrounded by round red nectar glands. The fruit is a minute round capsule.

References

External links

Jepson Manual Treatment
USDA Plants Profile for Chamaesyce micromera
Chamaesyce micromera — UC Photos gallery

micromera
Flora of California
Flora of the Southwestern United States
Flora of the Sonoran Deserts
Flora of the California desert regions
Natural history of the Colorado Desert
Natural history of the Mojave Desert
Taxa named by Pierre Edmond Boissier
Flora without expected TNC conservation status